Jon Marshall (born 1970) is a British industrial designer.

Biography 
Marshall studied product design at Ravensbourne College of Design and Communication and industrial design at the Royal College of Art. 

In 2012 he co-founded and led the industrial design consultancy Map Project Office where he created successful products and user experiences for global brands like Virgin Atlantic and Honda as well as start-ups like Kano and Sam Labs. Under his leadership, Map was named Creative Review's 2016 Agency of the Year and listed in 2016 by Fast Company as one of the most innovative companies in design.

In 2018 Marshall became a partner in Pentagram’s London office. His work fuses product design with environments, packaging and digital experiences, often working with emerging technologies like artificial intelligence and cryptocurrency.  Notable projects include the design of an immersive exhibition for Uniqlo LifeWear Day, generative hardware design for semiconductor company Graphcore and letterbox-friendly packaging for brain health brand Heights.  

His design for Yoto Player an interactive speaker for children, was listed as one of Time Magazine's best inventions of 2020 and awarded best consumer product by Design Week.   

During his career Marshall has won numerous design awards and was listed as one of Creative Review’s top 50 creative leaders.

References 

1970 births
Living people
Alumni of the Royal College of Art
British industrial designers
Pentagram partners (past and present)